Li Lung-chieh (李隆杰) is a Taiwanese manga artist. Some of his works include Roachgirl (覺醒人間-螂女飛翔傳) and Taiwan Determination : Legend of Beigang (新世紀北港神拳). He was nominated in the Algiers International Comics Festival of Algeria  with his comic book Animal Impact (動物衝擊頻道) in 2011. He published Taiwan Super Riders (台灣超級機車) and exhibited in Angoulême International Comics Festival and Planet Manga  of Centre Georges Pompidou in 2012.

Publications
Roachgirl (覺醒人間-螂女飛翔傳, Tong Li Publishing Co., 2008)
Animal Impact (動物衝擊頻道, Elephant White Cultural Enterprise Co., 2010)
Taiwan Super Riders (台灣超級機車, Elephant White Cultural Enterprise Co., 2011)
Taiwan Determination : Legend of Beigang (新世紀北港神拳, Gaea Books, Co., 2013，)
Ichthyophobia (怕魚的男人, China Times Publishing Co., 2015，）
Koxinga Z (1661國姓來襲, Gaea Books, Co., 2017，)
Formosa X (1624男人與島, Gaea Books, Co., 2021，)

Publications (French editions)
Ichthyophobia (Nazca Editions, 2021)
Koxinga Z - 1661 (Nazca Editions, 2023)
Formosa X - 1624 (Nazca Editions, 2023)

Awards
Ichthyophobia (怕魚的男人) - 2016 Silver Award at the 9th International Manga Award
Koxinga Z (1661國姓來襲) - 2019 Bronze Award at the 12th International Manga Award

References

External links
李隆杰還在路上 : Li Lung-chieh 's blog
Bald is the new beautiful: Taiwanese comic artist - Taipei Times

Taiwanese comics artists
1982 births
Living people